Hasan Arfa (1895 in Tbilisi – 1983 in Monte Carlo) was an Iranian general and ambassador to the Pahlavi dynasty.

He was a leading figure in the British military network in Iran.

Early life
Hasan Arfa was born in Tbilisi, Georgia (then part of the Russian Empire) to an Anglo-Russian mother and Iranian father. His mother, Ludmilla Jervis, was the daughter of a British diplomat and a Russian woman of the aristocratic Demidov family. His father, Reza Khan Arfa al-Dowleh, was a veteran Iranian diplomat serving as consul-general in Tbilisi; he later served as ambassador to Turkey and Russia. Arfa's parents divorced in 1900, after Arfa and his mother had moved to Paris, but his father, the senior Arfa al-Dowleh, provided comfortable homes in Europe for them.

Arfa received his early education from tutors and later attended private schools in Switzerland, Paris, and Monaco. In 1914, he joined the Iranian Imperial Guards, and during the early part of World War I that organization sponsored his training as a cavalry officer with the Swiss army. He joined the Iranian gendarmerie in 1920, and later, the army. As a cavalry officer, he campaigned against rebellious tribes in Azerbaijan, Kurdistan, Lorestan, and during the 1920s and rose rapidly through the ranks.

The Pahlavis

Arfa first met Reza Shah Pahlavi (ruled 1926 - 1941), who was then Minister of War, at the outset of the campaign against the Kurds in 1921. Reza Shah's forceful character left a deep impression on him, and Arfa remained a loyal supporter of the Pahlavis throughout his life. In 1923, Arfa married Hilda Bewicke, a British ballerina in Sergei Pavlovich Diaghilev's Russian Ballet whom he met in Monaco; they had one daughter, Leila. He subsequently served a brief tour in 1926 as military attaché in London and attended the Staff College in Paris from 1927 to 1929. After his training in France, he was promoted to the rank of lieutenant-colonel and placed in command of the newly formed Pahlavi Guards Cavalry Regiment, which he turned into a highly disciplined and professional unit. Reza Shah made him commandant of the Military Academy and in 1932 promoted him to the rank of colonel. In 1934, Arfa accompanied Reza Shah on his official visit to Turkey. He was appointed inspector general of the cavalry and armed forces in 1936 and promoted to general in 1939. During the joint Anglo-Soviet Invasion of Iran in August 1941, the shah appointed Arfa chief of staff in charge of the defenses for Tehran. After the British and Soviets defeated the Iranian army and forced Reza Shah to abdicate, his son and successor, Mohammad Reza Shah Pahlavi (r. 1941 - 1979), appointed Arfa chief of military intelligence.

Arfa became involved in national politics during the 1940s and 1950s. As Chief of the General Staff from 1944 to 1946, he authorized the supply of weapons to the Shahsavan tribesmen who opposed the autonomous government of Azerbaijan. In early 1946, Arfa was instrumental in gathering signatures of parliamentary deputies for a petition supporting Iran's complaint before the United Nations Security Council that Soviet forces continued to occupy northern Iran in contravention of an agreement to withdraw. Arfa's actions placed him in the camp of political leaders who tended to perceive malevolent intentions in Soviet policies but benign intentions in British policies. The pro-Soviet/anti-British politicians denounced Arfa in parliament and the press, and consequently Prime Minister Ahmad Qavam insisted that Arfa be dismissed from his post as chief of the general staff. In 1946, Arfa was imprisoned for seven months. He was eventually exonerated, but he was retired summarily from active duty in March 1947.

Arfa blamed his successor, Gen. Ali Razmara, for his forced retirement and subsequently co-operated with his political rivals, especially after Razmara was appointed prime minister in 1950. Nevertheless, Arfa genuinely was disturbed when Razmara was assassinated in 1951, because he believed the increasing level of political violence threatened the country. He served as minister of roads and communications in the brief government of Prime Minister Hosayn Ala during the month following Razmara's assassination, before the parliament voted in Mohammad Mossadegh as premier. Arfa distrusted Mossadegh and formed a political group, the National Movement, to disrupt gatherings of Mossadegh supporters, whom he considered to be extremists opposed to the continuation of the monarchy and a strong army. The National Movement's newspaper published many articles written by Arfa, supporting the shah and respect for Islam. Arfa maintained contact with a variety of political activists, including Mozaffar Baqai of the Toilers' party, the fiery preacher Ayatollah Sayyed Abu al-Qasem Kashani, and Shaban Jafari, an organizer of street mobs. Arfa became a founding member of the secret committee of military officers, the Committee to Save the Fatherland, formed in 1952 with the objective of overthrowing Mossadegh. Following the 1953 military coup that restored the shah to power, he served as Iran's ambassador to Turkey (1958 - 1961) and Pakistan (1961 - 1962). Subsequently he retired from active government service. He left Iran at the time of the Iranian Revolution of 1979 and died in Monte Carlo, Monaco in 1983.

References

Sources

Further reading
 Arfa, Hasan. Under Five Shahs. New York: Morrow; London: John Murray, 1964.
 Arfa, Hasan. The Kurds: An Historical and Political Study. London: Oxford University Press, 1966.

1895 births
1983 deaths
Imperial Iranian Army major generals
Demidov family
Government ministers of Iran
Ambassadors of Iran to Turkey
Ambassadors of Iran to Pakistan
People from Tbilisi
Iranian people of Russian descent
Iranian people of British descent
Russian people of Iranian descent
Iranian emigrants to Switzerland
Iranian emigrants to Monaco
Exiles of the Iranian Revolution in Monaco
Iranian Gendarmerie personnel